Jewell Junction is a highway junction and unincorporated community in Clatsop County, Oregon, United States. It is located at the intersection of U.S. Route 26 and Oregon Route 103, approximately nine miles southwest of Jewell.

References

Unincorporated communities in Clatsop County, Oregon
Unincorporated communities in Oregon